This article summarizes the world palladium production by country.

This is a list of countries by palladium production in kilograms, based upon data from the United States Geological Survey. In 2019, the world production of palladium totaled 210,000 kilograms—down 5% from 220,000 kg in 2018.

2010 - 2019 

* indicates "Natural resources of COUNTRY or TERRITORY" links.

2000 - 2009

1990 - 1999

References 

Palladium
Production